Kunturillu (Quechua for "black and white", also spelled Condorillo) may refer to:

 Kunturillu (Arequipa), a mountain in the Arequipa Region, Peru
 Kunturillu (Ayacucho), a mountain in the Ayacucho Region, Peru
 Kunturillu (Bolivia), a mountain in Bolivia
 Kunturillu or Rocha River, a river in Bolivia